Nelsonioideae is a subfamily of plants in the family Acanthaceae, with a pantropical distribution.

Genera 
 Anisosepalum
 Elytraria
 Gynocraterium
 Nelsonia
 Ophiorrhiziphyllon
 Saintpauliopsis
 Staurogyne

References

External links 
 
 
 

Acanthaceae
Asterid subfamilies